Crnče may refer to:
 Crnče (Bela Palanka), a village in Bela Palanka, Serbia
 Crnče (Jagodina), a village in Jagodina, Serbia

See also 
 Crnce, Kosovo